Catch22 is a social business, a not for profit business with a social mission which operates in the United Kingdom (England and Wales). Catch22 can trace its roots back 229 years, to the formation of The Philanthropic Society in 1788. Catch22 designs and delivers services that build resilience and aspiration in people and communities.

The organisation describes itself as “having the heart of a charity and the mind-set of a business”.

Catch22 was formed in 2008 by the merge of UK young people's organisations Rainer and Crime Concern.

Scope
Catch22's 1500 staff and volunteers work at every stage of the social welfare cycle, supporting 30,000 individuals from cradle to career. Today the organisation delivers alternative education, apprenticeships and employability programmes, justice and rehabilitation services (in prisons and in the community), gangs intervention work, emotional wellbeing and substance misuse, and children's social care programmes.

Catch22 is a member of the T2A Alliance, NCVO, CJA and ERSA.

Catch22 Chief Executive is Naomi Hulston, who replaced a retiring Chris Wright mid 2022.

HRH Princess Anne is patron of the organisation. The Princess Royal attends regular events organised by Catch22 where she often speaks on social issues such as child sexual exploitation and young people's mental health.

Inspired by the Joseph Heller novel, the organisation's name refers to the catch-22 situation faced by many of the people with whom it works. The name change took place in 2008 after the merger of the charities Rainer and Crime Concern.

History
Catch22 has its origins in the Philanthropic Society formed in 1788. A merger of the Royal Philanthropic Society and The Rainer Foundation took place in 1997 to form RPSRainer. In 2003 it changed its name to Rainer.

Royal Philanthropic Society
The Royal Philanthropic Society had its origins in the St Paul's Coffee House in London in 1788 where a group of men met to discuss the problems of homeless children who were to be found begging and stealing on the streets.  The Society began by opening homes where children in need and young offenders were trained in cottage industries working under the instruction of skilled tradesmen.  This was one of the first attempts in the United Kingdom to separate the treatment of young offenders from the adult population. In 1806 the Society was incorporated by Act of Parliament, sanctioning its work with juvenile delinquents.

Archives show that by 1848 1,500 children had been helped and only 1 in 20 committed further offences.

Philanthropic Farm School
In 1849 the Society founded the Farm School for Boys at Redhill in Surrey modelled on the Mettray Penal Colony in France.  The Reformatory School Act of Parliament (1854), championed by a movement supported by Charles Dickens, allowed the courts to send delinquents to the Society's reformatories instead of sending them to prison.

Concerned about the lack of hope for those who came before the courts the printer Frederic Rainer, a volunteer with the Church of England Temperance Society (CETS), wrote to them in 1876 with a five shilling donation towards a fund for rescue work in the police courts.  In response the CETS appointed a missionary to Southwark court, who became the basis for the London Police Court Mission (LPCM).

Between 1880 and 1902 eight full-time LPCM missionaries were appointed and the Mission opened homes and shelters to provide vocational training.  In 1907 the LPCM missionaries were appointed officers of the court who were later to be known as probation officers.

The Children and Young Person's Act (1933) introduced juvenile courts for children of 17 and younger and the Philanthropic Society's Redhill Farm School was given approved school status. In 1938 the Home Office assumed control of the probation service and the LPCM began to concentrate on hostels for probation trainees and to set up homes for children at risk, sexually abused children and for young mothers.

In 1952 the Philanthropic Society was granted royal status.

In 1964 the Philanthropic Society registered with the Charities Commission as Rainer, in recognition of Frederic Rainer's donation.

In 2008 Rainer merged with Crime Concern, another long established charity working with young people in the criminal justice system to become Catch22

Rainer Foundation
The Rainer Foundation was originally formed as the London Police Court Mission (LPCM) as a result of a 5 shilling gift made by Fredric Rainer in 1876 to Church of England Temperance Society part of the Temperance movement. In the letter attached to the gift Rainer asked "can nothing be done for him whose foot has once slipped". Originally the Missionaries, later called Probation Officers, were recruited from the 'respectable' classes. In 1907 under the aegis of the Probation of offenders Act, these missionaries became known as probation officers.

The LPCM was renamed the Rainer Foundation in the 1960s. In the early 1980s, the foundation developed a number of innovative schemes for young offenders influenced greatly by research carried out at Lancaster University. Under the leadership of its Director Richard Kay, the Foundation continued to develop innovative services for young 'offenders', young homeless people and young survivors of sexual abuse. In 1996 the Rainer Foundation merged with an even older philanthropic organization the Royal Philanthropic Society (RPS) and became known as Rainer RPS. Later the RPS was dropped.

Vision 
Catch22's vision is a strong society where everyone has a good place to live, a purpose and good people around them (The “3 P's”). The organisation exists to ensure that these are achievable for everyone, no matter what their background.

The Catch22 vision for public services is a system that is more human, unlocks the capacity in society, and champions local accountability.

Areas of work

Young people and Families 
Catch22 supports vulnerable young people and their families to feel safe, cared for and find a purpose in life through: strengthening family foundations, supporting children who go missing and/or are victims of sexual exploitation and working with care leavers. Catch22's services also tackle substance misuse, support emotional wellbeing, address youth violence and improve outcomes in youth justice.

Education 
Catch22 provides young people aged four to 18-year-olds with alternative education so they can progress and succeed in sustained education or employment. This is achieved through: running a Multi Academies Trust, running independent schools and delivering post-16 provision and National Citizen Service (NCS) projects.

In 2015 Catch22 partnered with Impetus-PEF to develop a blueprint for excellent alternative education provision.

Apprenticeships and Employability 
Catch22 is a provider delivering a number of apprenticeships and employability programmes. The programmes were created to be relevant to the needs and aspirations of learners and job seekers, as well as the needs of employers and the economy, today and in the future. Catch22 also invests in social enterprise and provides apprenticeships to get young people work ready and improve their employability skills.

Justice 
Catch22 seeks to make the justice system work by delivering effective rehabilitation through meaningful relationships. They operate in areas such as offender management, gangs in custody, victim services, community rehabilitation, veterans in custody and resettlement services.

Doing things differently 
Catch22 has been one of the leading organisations in trying to change the way public services are run. Its actions are governed by three main principles: being more human, unlocking capacity and local accountability. It's with these principles in mind that the organisation has been piloting new service models, exploring innovative ways of funding services and acting as a platform to support other organisations.

Social Investment 
In a changing financial environment, many social enterprises have had to find new ways to fund themselves and as a result, social investment has become a popular funding method. Catch22 has been using social investment to finance several projects and to develop social impact bonds.

Social Enterprise 
For Catch22 social enterprise offers innovative ways and self-sustaining opportunities to build on young people's strengths while opening up routes into work and self-employment. Examples of social enterprises Catch22 has developed are: Launch22, Auto22 and Propeller.

Building capacity in the sector 
Catch22 have been actively using its position to support selected organisations and individuals.

MAC-UK: In June 2014 Dr Charlie Howard, founding director of MAC-UK became the first Fellow in Social Entrepreneurship. The Catch22 Fellowship is an 18-month programme established to financially support outstanding individuals who have already demonstrated success in tackling a social problem, and who are looking to take their ideas to scale.

Only Connect: In October 2015 Only Connect was acquired by Catch22. A small London-based charity, Only Connect is recognised for its radical and human approach to rehabilitation. The agreement, which sees Only Connect remain an independent charity, was explicitly designed to foster innovation in public service delivery and it is hoped it will pave the way for a new type of relationship between smaller and larger sized charities.

Unlocked: In 2016 Catch22 has been incubating Unlocked Graduates, a Teach First-style programme which aims to attract talented graduates to work in prison for an initial two-year period. The goal is to transform prisons into learning environments, with education at the heart. Catch22 has been supporting Unlocked by providing office space, access to networks and staff resource.

Finance 
Catch22 has an ambitious strategy which seeks to ensure public services embrace the opportunity to be bold and innovative. This is reflected in the way the organisation itself does business and it will continue to explore the 'new world' of charity finance, and consider the ways in which social investment could benefit the business in the long term.

Local accountability 
Central to Catch22's vision for good public services is a move away from central policy making and budgetary accountability. For example, the organisation has welcomed the announcement that prison governors will be given control over budgets and rules in May 2016. Drawing from their experience of providing services in prisons, Catch22 has long advocated for local prisons to be governed by a governor supported by an entire local community, creating a sense of ownership and responsibility for what happens to those who end up incarcerated.

Achievements and recognitions

Publications 
May 2016: A new report from Catch22's Dawes Unit explored the extent and ways in which pupil gang involvement raises challenges for schools and identified best practice for schools in responding. The 'Safer Schools' report provided a first-of-its kind insight into pupil gang involvement in Alternative Provision (AP) schools, presenting the findings of research conducted in five AP schools across three UK cities. While the survey shows that just 31% of teachers work in schools with links to local crime prevention charities, Safer Schools highlights the need for schools to build strong relationships with community organisations.

In April 2016, Catch22 together with The National Children's Bureau NCB launched a collection of essays entitled 'Rethinking Children's Services: Fit for the Future?'. The authors challenge traditional approaches, critique current practice and put forward a range of ideas for the transformation of children's social care for the next decade and beyond.

July 2015: Catch22 Dawes Unit in partnership with Missing People launched a new report which provides evidence of gang-involved young people going missing as they are caught up in 'drug lines'. 'Running the Risks: The links between gang-involvement and young people going missing', revealed how gangs are setting children up in flats for weeks at a time to sell drugs in provincial areas. It called for gang-involved young people who go missing from home or care to be treated as victims rather than criminals.

Ofsted 
In June 2016, include Bristol, part of Catch22's network of independent schools, was awarded a 'Good' inspection grade following an Ofsted visit.

February 2016: The independent school, include Salisbury, which offers alternative education under the proprietorship of Catch22, gained a 'Good' Ofsted rating.

February 2016: Ofsted rated children's services in Cheshire West and Chester, where Catch22 delivers the Pan Cheshire Missing and Child Sexual Exploitation (CSE) service, as 'good'.

December 2015: Ofsted, the official Government body for inspecting schools and colleges, rated Catch22's Apprenticeships and Study Programme provision as Good.

April 2015: Catch22's independent school in Buckinghamshire gains Good Ofsted rating. include Buckinghamshire is the fifth include school awarded a 'Good' inspection grade across Catch22's network of independent schools.

Awards 
In April 2016 Catch22 was selected as a finalist in the national ERSA (Employment Related Services Association) Employability Awards 2016.

November 2015: Catch22 – in partnership with public service provider Interserve, and social finance experts Clubfinance – was announced as the winner of Big Society Capital's Business Impact Challenge.

November 2015: The Pan Cheshire Missing From Home and CSE service won the Partnership Working Award at the Children & Young People Now Awards. The awards are described by Children & Young People Now as a 'gold standard for everyone who works with children, young people and families'.

July 2014: Catch22 was one of ten finalists in the UK shortlisted for the 2014 Google Impact Challenge.

Other 
From May 2015 to May 2016, Catch22 resettlement services received 'Good' ratings from Her Majesty's Inspectorate of Prisons (HMIP) for all four unannounced inspections.

Organisations with similar names
The company name Catch22 (without a space) may also refer to a community interest company based in Seven Sisters (Tottenham), London called Catch 22 Academy. Catch 22 Academy is a journalism school founded in 2006.

References

External links

Telegraph article regarding Catch22's Ready or Not campaign: https://www.telegraph.co.uk/news/uknews/7054707/Third-of-young-adults-turn-to-parents-for-help-every-week.html

Youth charities based in the United Kingdom
Social welfare charities based in the United Kingdom
2008 establishments in the United Kingdom
Organizations established in 2008